Dirk Pietersz (1558 – c. 1621) was a Dutch Golden Age painter.

Biography
According to Karel van Mander he was born in Amsterdam, the son of Pieter Aertsen and the youngest brother of Pieter Pietersz the Elder and Aert Pietersz (who was eight years older). He moved to Fontainebleau where he died accidentally during the troubles there.

According to the RKD no works from Fontainebleau are known and only a portrait of the remonstrant preacher Simon Episcopius (1583-1643) survives.

References

1558 births
1620s deaths
Dutch Golden Age painters
Dutch male painters
Painters from Amsterdam